Starflower or star flower may refer to:

Plants
 Borage (Borago officinalis), an annual herb, and its product starflower oil
Calytrix, a shrub of the myrtle family, native to Australia
Erinus alpinus, an alpine plant
 Isotoma axillaris, a herbaceous perennial from Australia
Grewia occidentalis (crossberry or lavender star flower)
 Ipheion, a genus of small bulbous perennials
Orbea variegata, a succulent from South Africa
Ornithogalum, a genus of perennial bulbous plants, including:
O. arabicum (star-of-Bethlehem)
O. dubium (sun star or orange star)
O. narbonense (pyramidal star-of-Bethlehem)
O. nutans (drooping star-of-Bethlehem)
O. pyrenaicum (Bath asparagus, Prussian asparagus, spiked star-of-Bethlehem)
O. umbellatum (common star-of-Bethlehem)
 Trientalis/Lysimachia, shrubs of the primrose family including:
Trientalis borealis,  northern starflower
Trientalis europaea, European starflower or Arctic starflower
Trientalis latifolia, Pacific starflower

Other uses
Starflower (album), 2017 Jennifer Paige album
Starflower (My Little Pony), a pony character in the My Little Pony franchise
Starflower, 2012 novel by Anne Elisabeth Stengl